This page gathers the results of elections in Calabria.

Regional elections

Latest regional election

In the latest regional election, which took place on 26 January 2020, Jole Santelli of Forza Italia was elected president by a landslide, after that in the previous election in 2014 the Democratic Party had won by a landslide.

List of previous regional elections
1970 Calabrian regional election
1975 Calabrian regional election
1980 Calabrian regional election
1985 Calabrian regional election
1990 Calabrian regional election
1995 Calabrian regional election
2000 Calabrian regional election
2010 Calabrian regional election
2014 Calabrian regional election

 
Politics of Calabria